Træna Lighthouse is a coastal lighthouse in Træna Municipality in Nordland county, Norway.

The lighthouse was built in 1877 and automated in 1974. The light emits one white flash every 15 seconds.

See also

Lighthouses in Norway
List of lighthouses in Norway

References

External links
 Norsk Fyrhistorisk Forening 
 Picture of Træna Lighthouse

Lighthouses completed in 1877
Træna
Lighthouses in Nordland
1877 establishments in Norway